Abeh-ye Palang (also Romanized as Ābeh-ye Palang; also known as Oveh Palang and Oveh Paknak) is a village in Bagheli-ye Marama Rural District, in the Central District of Gonbad-e Qabus County, Golestan Province, Iran. At the 2006 census, its population was 390, in 91 families.

References 

Populated places in Gonbad-e Kavus County